Ramkumar Mishra is an Indian tabla player. He belongs to Banaras Gharana.

Life and career
Ramkumar Mishra is the grandson of Pandit Anokhelal Mishra from Banaras gharana and son of Pandit Chhannulal Mishra. Ramkumar was initiated into tabla playing by his mother, Smt. Manorama Mishra, daughter of Pandit Anokhelal Mishra, and, thereafter, received his tutelage under another renowned tabla player, Pandit Chhote Lal Mishra, his maternal uncle.

Some of the awards he has received are:
Taal Mani Award.
Haridas, Mumbai.
Laya Bhaskar, Natraj Cultural Centre, Melbourne, Australia.
Tabla Shiromani, Government of Bihar.
Award from Darwin, Australia.

External links
personal website: http://www.ramkumarmishra.com

References

Living people
Hindustani instrumentalists
Tabla players
Indian drummers
Year of birth missing (living people)